Tinningstedt (North Frisian: Taningstää) is a municipality in the district of Nordfriesland, in Schleswig-Holstein, Germany. Most of the area is divided up into oddly shaped divisions of land. The area is primarily rural, with open country.

References
2. https://www.google.com/maps/place/25917+Tinningstedt,+Germany/@54.8090

Nordfriesland